Qiande (乾德) was a Chinese era name used by several emperors of China. It may refer to:

Qiande (919–924), era name used by Wang Zongyan, emperor of Former Shu
Qiande (963–968), era name used by Emperor Taizu of Song (also used by concurrent rulers of Southern Tang, Wuyue and Goryeo)